Scorpion Design is an American technology company that provides marketing and technology services to small businesses. The company is known for using artificial intelligence to gain insights on how to expand a business. It is based in Lehi, Utah, U.S.

History
Scorpion was founded in 2001 by Rustin Kretz. It started out as a website builder for legal companies and has expanded to include a full stack of technology and marketing services for the legal, healthcare, home services, and franchise spaces.

Over the years, Scorpion has played its part in market research and surveys, with the latest survey held in 2022 about the support of local businesses by people during the COVID-19 pandemic.

In April 2021, Scorpion received $100 million in investment from Bregal Sagemount.

Scorpion was part of the Inc. 5000 List of America's Fastest-Growing Companies between 2011 and 2020.

Acquisitions
In July 2017, Scorpion acquired a New York-based marketing firm named Driven Local.

In September 2021, Scorpion acquired a franchise marketing agency, Wheat Creative, and it was added into its franchise division. In November 2021, Scorpion made another acquisition and acquired a digital marketing company, MediaSmack, which is active in the legal industry. In the same year, the company acquired a software company, CanIRank.

Technology
Scorpion employs artificial intelligence to assist businesses in improving their ad purchases, getting to know their clients better, and expanding.

Scorpion technology assists businesses in ranking in search engines, managing lead flow, and knowing in detail about cash flows, allowing them to make better decisions. They also provide an all-in-one dashboard where a company can view the results. Live chat, texting, and marketing automation is also available.

Operations and offices
Scorpion offices are located in Dallas, Texas; Valencia, California; Salt Lake City, Utah; Islandia, New York; and Denver, Colorado.

In March 2021, Scorpion moved its head office to Utah from California.

In July 2021, Scorpion relocated its Addison, Texas office to Dallas, Texas.

References

American companies established in 2001
Companies based in Salt Lake City
2001 establishments in the United States